The Montview League is a high school athletic league that is part of the CIF Southern Section. Member schools are located in the east San Gabriel Valley region of Los Angeles County

Members
 Azusa High School
 Duarte High School
 Gladstone High School
 Nogales High School
 Sierra Vista High School
 Workman High School

References

CIF Southern Section leagues